The Hussards was a French literary movement in the 1950s which opposed Existentialism and the figure of the politically engaged intellectual as personified by Jean-Paul Sartre.

Origins
Its name was coined by the literary critic Bernard Frank, who grouped several figures under the ironic name of "hussards" (French for "hussars") in an article published in December 1952 in the journal Les Temps modernes, titled "Grognards et hussards" ("Old Guards and Hussars"). Frank chose that name because of Roger Nimier's novel The Blue Hussar (Le Hussard bleu).

Membership
The Hussards were led by Jacques Chardonne and Paul Morand, and counted as core members Antoine Blondin, Michel Déon, Jacques Laurent and Roger Nimier. As in many literary or musical movements, the interested members rejected the label of "Hussards," Michel Déon (in Bagages pour Vancouver) and Jacques Laurent (in Histoire égoïste) denying the very existence of the literary movement. However, other authors were consciously attached to the movement, such as Kléber Haedens, Stephen Hecquet, Geneviève Dormann, Félicien Marceau and Jacques Perret.

The Hussards may best be understood as a literary expression of the monarchist Action Française (AF) or, in a broader sense, of the literary right. Almost all of the Hussards later participated to the Cahiers de la Table Ronde, renamed La Table Ronde, a review created for the purpose of contesting the predominance of Les Temps modernes and edited by Roland Laudenbach to which famous writers such as François Mauriac, Jean Giono or Jean Paulhan contributed.

Bibliography 

 Raphaël Chauvancy, Jacques Laurent, Éditions Pardès, coll. « Qui suis-je? », 2009.
 Marc Dambre, (dir.)   Les hussards Une génération littéraire, Paris, Presses Sorbonne Nouvelle, 2000.
 François Dufay,  Le soufre et le moisi. La droite littéraire après 1945. Chardonne, Morand et les hussards, Paris, Perrin, 2006. 
 Bernard Frank, "Grognards & Hussards", Les Temps modernes, 1952. Réédition dans Grognards & Hussards, suivi de La Turquie, Paris, Le Dilettante, 1984.
 Pol Vandromme, La Droite buissonnière, Paris, Les Sept Couleurs, 1960.

French literary movements
Action Française